The Heisman Trophy, one of the highest individual awards in American college football, has been awarded 86 times since its creation in 1935, including 85 unique winners and one two-time winner. The trophy is given annually to the most outstanding college football player in the National Collegiate Athletic Association (NCAA) Division I Football Bowl Subdivision (FBS), and is awarded by the Heisman Trust, successors of the awards from the Downtown Athletic Club at an annual ceremony.

In 1935, the award, then known as the DAC Trophy, was created by New York City's Downtown Athletic Club to recognize the best college football player "east of the Mississippi River". In that inaugural year, the award went to Jay Berwanger from the University of Chicago. Berwanger was later drafted by the Philadelphia Eagles of the National Football League but declined to sign for them. He never played professional football for any team, instead choosing to pursue a career in business. In 1936, the club's athletic director, football pioneer John Heisman, died and the trophy was renamed in his honor. Larry Kelley, the second winner of the award, was the first to win it as the "Heisman Trophy". In addition to the name change, the award also became a nationwide achievement. With the new name, players west of the Mississippi became eligible; the first player from the western United States was selected in 1938, TCU quarterback Davey O'Brien.

On June 10, 2010, following several years of investigation, the NCAA announced that USC running back Reggie Bush, the 2005 Heisman trophy winner, received gifts from agents while still in college. The university received major sanctions, and there were reports that the Heisman Trophy Trust would strip his award. In September of that year, Bush voluntarily forfeited his title as the 2005 winner. The Heisman Trust decided to leave the award vacated with no new winner to be announced for the season.

A school has had a Heisman winner in back-to-back years six times, though one of those awards is Bush's forfeited trophy (Yale 1936–37, Army 1945–46, Ohio State 1974–75, USC 2004–05, Oklahoma 2017–18 and Alabama 2020–21). Only one player, Ohio State's Archie Griffin, has won the award twice. Oklahoma is the only school to have two players win the award in back-to-back years playing the same position (quarterbacks Baker Mayfield followed by Kyler Murray).

Between 1936 and 2001, the award was given at an annual gala ceremony at the Downtown Athletic Club in New York City. The Downtown Athletic Club's facilities were damaged during the September 11, 2001 attacks. Due to financial difficulties stemming from the damage, the DAC declared bankruptcy in 2002, turning over its building to creditors. Following the club's bankruptcy and the loss of the original Downtown Athletic Club building, the Yale Club of New York City assumed presenting honors in 2002 and 2003. The ceremony was moved to the New York Marriott Marquis in Times Square for the 2002, 2003, and 2004 presentations. Between 2005 and 2019, the event was held at PlayStation Theater in Times Square. The move to the PlayStation Theater allowed the Downtown Athletic Club (and ultimately, the award's successor, The Heisman Trust) to resume full control of the event (the most prominent example of which was the return of the official portraits of past winners), despite the loss of the original presentation hall. Shortly after the 2019 ceremony was held, the PlayStation Theater was permanently closed; as a result, the Heisman Trust began searching for a new location to conduct the trophy presentation. The 2020 ceremony would ultimately be held at the studios of ESPN in Bristol, Connecticut due to the COVID-19 pandemic, with the ceremony being held on January 5, 2021.

In terms of balloting, the fifty states of the U.S. are split into six regions (Far West, Mid Atlantic, Mid West, North East, South, South West), and six regional representatives are selected to appoint voters in their states. Each region has 145 media votes, for a total of 870 votes. In addition, all previous Heisman winners may vote, and one final vote is counted through public balloting. The Heisman ballots contain a 3-2-1 point system, in which each ballot ranks the voter's top three players and awards them three points for a first-place vote, two points for a second-place vote, and one point for a third-place vote. The points are tabulated, and the player with the highest total of points across all ballots wins the Heisman Trophy.

Key

List of Heisman Trophy winners

Trophies won by school 
This is a list of the colleges and universities who have had a player win a Heisman trophy. USC, Ohio State, Oklahoma, and Notre Dame are tied for the most trophies at 7 each. USC also previously had 7 winners but the 2005 award was vacated, although their official total is again 7 with the 2022 award to Trojan quarterback Caleb Williams. Ohio State has the distinction of the only two-time winner, Archie Griffin. In total, players from 40 schools have won a Heisman Trophy, while 19 schools have more than one trophy.

Trophies won by position 
This is a list of the positions of players who have won a Heisman Trophy. When players perform at multiple positions in a single season, each position is counted as a separate entity. For example, Desmond Howard of Michigan played both wide receiver and return specialist in 1991. On this list, Howard is counted twice for that year, once for each position he played.

* = includes the vacated 2005 award.

References

External links